, is a Japanese professional footballer who plays as a forward for J2 League club Blaublitz Akita, on loan from Zweigen Kanazawa.

Club statistics
Updated to 15 December 2022.

References

External links

Profile at Ehime FC

1994 births
Living people
Association football forwards
Japanese footballers
Ehime FC players
Zweigen Kanazawa players
Blaublitz Akita players
J2 League players
People from El Paso, Texas